Kazimierz Idaszewski (January 16, 1878 in Nochow by Śrem - January 16, 1965 in Wrocław) was a Polish scholar and specialist of the electric machines and of electrochemistry, professor of the universities of Lvov, Silesia and Wrocław, and a member of Polish Academy of Sciences. Idaszewski was a professor at Lviv Polytechnic prior to World War II and gave the first lecture at Wrocław after the war on November 15th, now celebrate as the Wrocław University of Science and Technology Day. At Wrocław University of Science and Technology, a square is named after him in the Monument to the Martyrdom of Lviv Professors.

Prior to the war, he was elected as a councilor of the Lviv City Council in May 1939.

References 

1878 births
1965 deaths
Academic staff of the University of Lviv
Academic staff of the University of Silesia in Katowice
Academic staff of the Wrocław University of Science and Technology